DFS Records is a record label founded in 2003 by record producer Dan "DFS" Johnson. The independent label was the former home to award-winning Canadian recording artist Promise. In 2003 the label released its first single "Tonite" featuring Aion Clarke from Promise's debut album The Promise That Heaven Kept, it went on to reach #4 on the Rhythmic Top 10 - Canadian Christian Radio Chart.

Artists

Current acts

Former acts

Discography

Awards
 2002 CGMA Covenant Award for "Hip-Hop/Rap Song of the Year" for "Alright" by Promise
 2003 Vibe Award nominee for "Best Hip-Hop/Rap Album of the Year" for "The Promise That Heaven Kept" by Promise
 2003 UMAC Award nominee for "Best Gospel Recording" for "Alright" by Promise
 2009 CGMA Covenant Award winner for "Rap/Hip-Hop Album of the Year" for "More Than Music" by Promise

References

External links
 www.dfsrecords.com

Canadian hip hop record labels